Angelo Bissessarsingh (September 1982 – February 2, 2017) was an historian and author from Trinidad and Tobago. His written works include A Walk Back in Time: Snapshots of the History of Trinidad and Tobago. He wrote a column entitled "Back in Time" for the Trinidad Guardian. He was also the curator of the Virtual Museum of Trinidad and Tobago, a Facebook group that remains very active with nearly 44,000 members (as of mid-2022) and is currently managed by Patricia Bissessar, the historian's aunt. With the help of other history buffs and qualified historians, his legacy and passion have remained active through the “Angelo Bissessarsingh’s Virtual Museum of T&T.”

Bissessarsingh was diagnosed with pancreatic cancer in 2015 and initially given six months to live. He died on 2 February 2017 at his home in Siparia, aged 34.

Awards
Bissessarsingh was awarded the Hummingbird Medal (Gold) for his service in the field of education and history.

References

External links
 Virtual Museum of Trinidad and Tobago Facebook Group

1982 births
2017 deaths
Deaths from cancer in Trinidad and Tobago
Deaths from pancreatic cancer
21st-century Trinidad and Tobago historians
Recipients of the Hummingbird Medal
People from San Fernando, Trinidad and Tobago
People from Siparia region